State Route 43 (SR 43) is a south to north highway in Tennessee that is 56.79 miles (91.39 km) long. It begins in Madison County and ends in Obion County. State Route 43 is little-known by the general public by this designation as it is overlain by U.S. Route 45E for most of its length; the "43" designation is seen largely on mileposts.  Two short sections of this route at Martin and South Fulton is fully signed. SR 43 from its southern terminus to Milan is designated as a Strategic Highway Network connector route servicing the Milan Arsenal.

Route description

Most of SR 43 is a four-lane divided highway, which either overlies or bypasses its original route.

Madison County

SR 43 begins in Madison County in Three Way at an interchange with US 45/US 45W/SR 5. It goes northeast as a divided four-lane highway, overlain by US 45E, and SR 186 for a short distance, before leaving Three Way and crossing into Gibson County.

Gibson County

US 45E/SR 43 immediately enter Medina, where they bypass downtown on the western side and have an intersection with SR 152. They then leave Medina and continue north to enter Milan and have an intersection with SR 187 before becoming an undivided four-lane as it passes through residential areas. US 45E/SR 43 then enters downtown and becomes concurrent with SR 104. They then have an intersection with US 70A/US 79/SR 76/SR 77, where SR 77 joins the concurrency, before continuing north through downtown to an intersection with Front Street, where SR 77 and SR 104 split off to the west. US 45E/SR 43 continue north through residential areas to have an intersection with SR 425 before leaving Milan and continuing north through rural areas, where it becomes a divided highway again. US 45E/SR 43 cross a bridge over the Rutherford Fork of the Obion River before passing through Idlewild and Bradford, where it bypasses downtown to the west, becomes concurrent with SR 54, and has an intersection with SR 105. The highway then crosses the South Fork of the Obion River to enter Weakley County.

Weakley County

US 45E/SR 43/SR 54 then becomes an undivided highway again and enters Greenfield, where it goes straight through downtown, having an intersection with SR 124 and SR 54 splitting off and going east along Broad Street. US 45E/SR 43 the leave town and have an intersection with SR 445 before leaving Greenfield. The highway continues north through rural areas, becoming a divided highway again, before passing through Sharon, which it bypasses completely along its west side and has an interchange with SR 89. US 45E/SR 43 then enter Martin and come to an interchange with SR 216. Here, US 45E Bus/SR 372 begins and takes over the original route of US 45E/SR 43 through the city, US 45E turns east to become concurrent with SR 216, and SR 43 becomes signed as a primary highway and turns west along SR 216 and Skyhawk Parkway. SR 43/SR 216 go northwest as a 2-lane highway before SR 216 breaks off along Baker Road and continues west. SR 43 continues north to bypass the city along its west side to have an intersection with SR 431 after passing through a business district. SR 43 then has an interchange with SR 22 before passing through a rural part of the city and coming to an intersection with US 45E/SR 372, where SR 372 ends and SR 43 rejoins US 45E. US 45E/SR 43 then cross a bridge over the Obion River to enter Obion County.

Obion County

US 45E/SR 43 continue north through rural areas as a divided highway, where they have an intersection with SR 190, before entering South Fulton and coming to an intersection with unsigned SR 215, where US 45E turns west along SR 215 while SR 43 breaks off again, this time as a signed secondary highway, to pass through town as a 2-lane highway to come to the Kentucky state line, where SR 43 ends at an intersection with KY 129 and KY 307 in downtown.

Signed Segments

At Martin, SR 43 breaks free from US 45E as a signed primary highway and bypasses Martin to the west.  This road is the original US 45E around Martin. It is not limited access, and because of its location, it could not easily be converted into a four-lane limited access highway in the 1990s.  As a result, a new divided, limited-access four-lane US 45E was constructed around the east side of Martin where more land was available, and the original SR 43 designation was revealed on signposts.

North of Martin, SR 43 rejoins US 45E and continues as an undivided four-lane highway to South Fulton, where it breaks free again as a signed secondary highway and follows the original US 45E Business Route through town to the Kentucky state line while US 45E bypasses to the west.

Counties traversed (south to north)
State Route 43 traverses the counties shown in the table below.

Major intersections

External links
Tennessee Department of Transportation
Federal Highway Administration HEPGIS NHS Viewer

References

043
Transportation in Madison County, Tennessee
Transportation in Gibson County, Tennessee
Transportation in Weakley County, Tennessee
Transportation in Obion County, Tennessee